The 1999 Stanley Cup Finals was the championship series of the National Hockey League's (NHL) 1998–99 season, and the culmination of the 1999 Stanley Cup playoffs. It was contested by the Eastern Conference champion Buffalo Sabres and the Western Conference champion Dallas Stars. It was the 106th year of the Stanley Cup being contested.

The Sabres were led by captain Michael Peca, head coach Lindy Ruff and goaltender Dominik Hasek. The Stars were led by captain Derian Hatcher, head coach Ken Hitchcock and goaltender Ed Belfour. The Stars defeated the Sabres four games to two to win their first Stanley Cup, becoming the eighth post-1967 expansion team to earn a championship, and the first team based in the Southern United States to win the Cup.

The series ended with a controversial triple-overtime goal in game six, when replays showed that Stars forward Brett Hull scored with his skate in the crease. Although the Sabres protested later, the league stated that the goal had been reviewed and was judged as a good goal, since Hull had maintained possession of the puck as it exited the crease just before he shot it.

Background

Buffalo defeated the Ottawa Senators 4–0, the Boston Bruins 4–2, and Toronto Maple Leafs 4–1 to advance to the Finals.

Dallas defeated the Edmonton Oilers 4–0, the St. Louis Blues 4–2, and the Colorado Avalanche 4–3 to advance to the Finals.

Game summaries

Game one

The opening game was in Dallas and it was the visiting Buffalo Sabres who struck first, winning 3–2 in overtime. Dallas led 1–0 on a power play goal by Brett Hull, but Stu Barnes and Wayne Primeau scored 5:04 apart in the third to give Buffalo a 2–1 lead. Jere Lehtinen tied the game in the final minute of the third period, but Jason Woolley scored at 15:30 of overtime to give the Sabres the series lead.

Game two

With three seconds left in the period, Dallas center Mike Modano tripped Buffalo goaltender Dominik Hasek, and a number of scrums broke out as time expired. Dallas winger Joe Nieuwendyk fought Buffalo center Brian Holzinger in the circle to the right of Hasek. These were the first fighting majors in three years in the final round, and it was also Nieuwendyk's first fighting major in five years in either the playoffs or regular season.

After the scoreless opening period, the teams traded goals in the middle frame. Craig Ludwig's first goal in 102 playoff games gave Dallas its first lead of the game in the third period, but Alexei Zhitnik tied it 71 seconds later. Brett Hull scored on a slap shot, a one-timer on a pass from Tony Hrkac, from the top of the circle to Hasek's left with 2:50 remaining in the game, but Buffalo had an excellent chance to tie the game with Derian Hatcher being assessed a high-sticking minor 19 seconds later. During the power play, Buffalo pulled Hasek for a 6-on-4 attacking advantage, but the Stars were able to kill the penalty, and Hatcher scored an empty-netter just three seconds after emerging from the penalty box.  The empty net goal sealed the win for Dallas, and evened the series at one game apiece. Mike Modano left the game with approximately ten minutes to play after suffering a broken wrist.

Game three

The series shifted to Buffalo for games three and four. It was the visiting Dallas Stars turn to win one on the road, winning 2–1. With Modano hampered by his wrist injury, and Hull leaving the game with a groin injury, Joe Nieuwendyk's two goals, including his sixth game-winner of the playoffs, led Dallas to the win.

Game four

Facing a two games to one deficit in the series, the Sabres came through with a 2–1 victory on Dixon Ward's game-winning goal in the second period.

Game five

With the series tied at two games apiece and returning to Dallas, Ed Belfour made 23 saves to shut out the Sabres, and move Dallas within one win of the Stanley Cup.

Game six

The series shifted back to Marine Midland Arena for game six, where the Dallas Stars would seek their first Stanley Cup, while the Buffalo Sabres would fight for a win to extend the series to a seventh and final game.

Dallas, which allowed the first goal in the earlier two games played at Marine Midland Arena, took a 1–0 lead on one of its few scoring chances in the first period when Lehtinen scored his tenth goal of the playoffs at 8:09. The Sabres tied the game with their first goal since the third period of game four when Barnes' wrist shot eluded Belfour with 1:39 to play in the second period.

The game remained tied at one through the third period and the first two overtime periods, despite several chances by both teams to score. At 14:51 of the third overtime period, Brett Hull scored to end the series and win Dallas their first Stanley Cup. Joe Nieuwendyk was awarded the Conn Smythe Trophy as the most valuable player in the playoffs.

It was the longest Cup-winning game in Finals history, and the second-longest Finals game overall, after game one of the 1990 Stanley Cup Finals, which ended at 15:13 of the third overtime. 

This was the first time since 1994 that the Stanley Cup Finals did not end in a sweep. It is the Stars' only Stanley Cup win, while Buffalo has not returned to the Finals since. It was the Sabres' second Stanley Cup Finals appearance; the first was a loss to Philadelphia in 1975. It was the third appearance for the Stars' franchise, and their first since moving to Dallas from Minnesota in 1993. Minnesota (known at the time as the North Stars) lost in the Finals to the New York Islanders in 1981 and to Pittsburgh in 1991. Dallas returned to the Finals in 2000 and 2020 but lost both series.

Hull's series-ending goal
In the third overtime, Jere Lehtinen took a shot from the left circle that was stopped by Dominik Hasek. Brett Hull was not in the crease for the first shot. The rebound came near Hull's left skate, which Hull used to kick the puck to his stick, which was just outside the crease. His left skate entered the crease just before his second shot went in and ended the series.

None of the Sabres players or coaches questioned the legality of the goal in the immediate aftermath. It was not until league commissioner Gary Bettman was on the ice to hand out the trophies that Buffalo coach Lindy Ruff returned to his bench and began screaming at Bettman to explain why the goal had not been reviewed. In the Sabres' locker room, players who had seen the replays were infuriated. Hasek recalled, "My first reaction was 'Let's get back on the ice.' But it's 2 o'clock in the morning and I look at everyone and it's like, 'I'm already out of my pants. It's impossible.'"

The NHL had sent a private memo out earlier in the season with a clarification to the in-the-crease rule. The memo stated that if a player was in control of the puck, a skate could be in the crease even if the puck was not, and a goal in that circumstance would count. NHL Director of Officiating Bryan Lewis said after the game that the goal had been reviewed, just as every goal that season had been, and the officials in the video review booth had determined that since Hull was deemed to have been in possession of the puck throughout the play, he was allowed to shoot and score a goal, even though one skate had entered the crease before the puck.

Among Sabres fans, both the game and the play itself are often simply referred to as "No Goal".

Team rosters
Bolded years under Finals appearance indicates year won Stanley Cup.

Dallas Stars

Buffalo Sabres

Stanley Cup engraving
The 1999 Stanley Cup was presented to Stars captain Derian Hatcher by NHL Commissioner Gary Bettman following the Stars 2–1 triple overtime win over the Sabres in game six.

The following Stars players and staff had their names engraved on the Stanley Cup

1998–99 Dallas Stars

Broadcasting
In Canada, the series was televised on CBC. In the United States, this was fifth and final year in which coverage of the Cup Finals was split between Fox and ESPN. Fox aired games one, two, and five; while ESPN had games three, four, and six. Had there been a game seven, it would have aired on Fox. Under the U.S. TV contracts that would take effect beginning next season, ABC would take over for Fox as the NHL's network television partner.

Aftermath
The following year, the Dallas Stars returned to the Stanley Cup Finals. They faced the New Jersey Devils, but lost in six games. The Sabres lost in the first round to the Philadelphia Flyers in five games.

See also
 1998–99 NHL season
 1999 Stanley Cup playoffs
 List of Stanley Cup champions

References

External links
 Explanation of the crease rule and Hull's goal, with overhead view

 
Stanley Cup
Buffalo Sabres games
Dallas Stars games
Stanley Cup Finals
Ice hockey in the Dallas–Fort Worth metroplex
Stanley Cup
Stanley Cup
June 1999 sports events in the United States
Sports competitions in Dallas
1990s in Dallas
1999 in Texas
Sports competitions in Buffalo, New York
20th century in Buffalo, New York
Ice hockey competitions in Texas
Ice hockey competitions in New York (state)